Nasser Ali Al-Shimli (born 15 February 1989) is an Omani footballer who plays for Al-Oruba SC.

Club career
On 4 September 2014, he signed a one-year contract with Al-Oruba SC.

Club career statistics

International career
Nasser is part of the first team squad of the Oman national football team. He was selected for the national team for the first time in 2010. He made his first appearance for Oman on 17 November 2010 in a friendly match against Belarus. He has represented the national team in the 2010 Gulf Cup of Nations, the 2014 FIFA World Cup qualification and the 2015 AFC Asian Cup qualification.

Honours

Club
With Al-Nahda
Oman Professional League (1): 2013–14
Sultan Qaboos Cup Runner-up: 2012, 2013
Oman Super Cup (2): 2009, 2014

References

External links

Nasser Al-Shimli - GOAL.com
Nasser Al-Shimli - FootballDatabase.eu
Nasser Al-Shimli - GOALZZ.com
Nasser Al-Shimli - KOOORA
Nasser Al-Shimli - ASIAN CUP Australia 2015

Living people
1989 births
People from Al Ain
Omani footballers
Oman international footballers
Association football defenders
2015 AFC Asian Cup players
Al-Nahda Club (Oman) players
Dhofar Club players
Al-Orouba SC players
Oman Professional League players